Žikarce is a settlement in the Slovene Hills in the Municipality of Duplek in northeastern Slovenia. The area is part of the traditional region of Styria. The municipality is now included in the Drava Statistical Region.

References

External links
Žikarce at Geopedia

Populated places in the Municipality of Duplek